World Builder is a game creation system for point-and-click adventure games. It was released in 1986 by Silicon Beach Software and had already been used for creating Enchanted Scepters in 1984. On August 7, 1995, developer  William C. Appleton released World Builder as freeware.

Functionality
The games World Builder created used different layers of code to manipulate the images the game contained: object code, scene code, and finally world code. The World Template included with the program contained default world code with default failure responses to standard text commands like north, south, up, down, and so on.  Other than actions with characters (which were always combat oriented) and clicking on objects to pick them up everything had to set up through code and dialog boxes.

The map is organized in compass directions and up/down as was common in earlier interactive fiction. Characters can be defined to move around independently and interacted with. There is also a special provision for weapons, which have a stochastic impact just as the dice of role-playing games.  The game system includes QuickDraw vector graphics, a scripting language and digitized sound. A large number of games were made and released in circulation, many after the application was made freeware in 1995. The software does not support 32 bit addressing and hence games created with it are not compatible with System 7 or later.  A ResEdit hack was provided to allow the program (and its games) to run on System 7 to 9 but sounds would not play on Power PC Macs.

Ray Dunakin, author of numerous titles using the game development system, contributed various documentation and supporting files for the World Builder 1.2 release.

Reception
The program was reviewed in 1987 in Dragon #118 by Hartley and Patricia Lesser in "The Role of Computers" column. The reviewers stated that "The variety of worlds, scenes, and characters you can create and motivate seems endless... We are really impressed with World Builder." In a subsequent column, the reviewers gave the program 3½ out of 5 stars.

In 1994, World Builder along with Course Builder, SuperCard, and HyperDA was cited as the reason Appleton was "something of a legend".

Games
Another Fine Mess
A Mess O' Trouble
Bug Hunt
Enchanted Scepters
Little Pythagoras
Lost Crystal
 Minitorian
Midnight Snack
Mountain Of Mayhem
 Psychotic!
Quest for T-Rex
Radical Castle
Ray's Maze
Star Trek Game
Wishing Well

See also
Adventure Construction Set
Adventure Game Studio
MacVenture

References

External links
The unofficial World Builder home page (internet archive; 2006 Jan 20)
World Builder description at Applefritter
Ray's Maze page - with a link to download World Builder

1986 software
Adventure game engines
Classic Mac OS-only games
Classic Mac OS games
Macintosh-only software
Freeware game engines